The International Expressive Arts Therapy Association (IEATA) is a non-profit, professional organization founded in 1994 to encourage the creative spirit. It supports expressive arts therapists, artists, educators, consultants and others using integrative, multimodal arts processes for personal and community growth. IEATA provides a professional guild and an international network through sponsoring bi-annual conferences. It provides a global forum for dialogue, promotes guiding principles for professional practice, and works to increase recognition and use of expressive arts as a tool for psychological, physical and spiritual wellness.

Memberships 

IEATA offers two kinds of registration for professional memberships.
"REAT" - registration is designed for those using the Expressive Arts in psychotherapy.
"REACE" - registration designed for expressive arts consultants and educators using the expressive arts in a broad range of approaches in education, organizational development, health fields and more.

Bibliography 
Knill, P. (de), Barba, H. & Fuchs, M. (1995). Minstrels of soul: intermodal expressive therapy. Canada: Palmerston Press.
Kossak, M. (2008). "Therapeutic Attunement: A transpersonal view of Expressive arts therapy". The Arts in Psychotherapy. 36(1), 13–18.
Levine, S. and Levine, E. (Eds.) (1999). Foundations of expressive arts therapy: Theoretical and clinical perspectives. London and Philadelphia: Jessica Kingsley Publishers.
Levine, S. (1992). Poesis: the language of psychology and speech of the soul. PA: Jessica Kingsley Publishers.
Malchiodi, C. (ed.) (2005). Expressive Therapies. New York, NY: Guilford Press.
McNiff, S. (2004). Art heals: how creativity heals the soul. Boston, MA: Shambala.
McNiff, S. (1992) Arts and Medicine. Boston, MA: Shambhala.
McNiff, S. (1981). The Arts and Psychotherapy. Springfield, IL: Charles Thomas, Pub.
Rogers, N. (1995). The creative connection: Expressive arts as healing. Palo Alto, CA: Science and Behavior Books, Inc.

External links 
Organisation main site

International professional associations
Art therapy